Last Night on Earth may refer to:

"Last Night on Earth" (U2 song), a single by U2 from their 1997 album Pop
"Last Night on Earth", a song by Delta Goodrem from her 2004 album Mistaken Identity
"Last Night on Earth", a song in the rock opera album 21st Century Breakdown by Green Day
Last Night on Earth: Live in Tokyo, a 2009 live EP by Green Day
Last Night on Earth (Noah and the Whale album), a 2011 album by Noah and the Whale
Last Night on Earth (Lee Ranaldo album), a 2013 album by Lee Ranaldo and the Dust
Last Night on Earth: The Zombie Game, a survival horror board game
"Last Night on Earth", a song by Powerman 5000 from their album Korea Tour EP

See also
Batman: Last Knight on Earth, a DC Black Label comic book limited series
 Night on Earth (disambiguation)